The Melbourne Continuation School was Victoria's first state secondary school, established in 1905, from the initiative of Director of Education, Frank Tate. The school was founded on the old National Model School in Spring Street, with principal Joseph Hocking. The opening of the school marked the beginning of secondary state education in Victoria.  The school site is now occupied by the Royal Australasian College of Surgeons.

Secondary state education
State secondary education was co-educational and secular. "Continuation" was used to name the school to bypass legal blockages of secondary state education in Victoria. Criticisms of the school were that it was to be secular, and it would not be single-sex. However, the idea was supported in a very short time, and was renamed to Melbourne High School in 1912.

By 1914, the school was reaching overcapacity. The favoured solution was to split the school into two single-sex schools. In 1927, the boys moved to a site in South Yarra - leaving the girls in the old building in Spring Street. From then on, Melbourne High School was a single-sex school for males. In 1931, the girls moved to a new site, named the Mac.Robertson Girls' High School.

The Melbourne Continuation School no longer exists, but it marks the beginning of Victorian secondary state education.

Notable students
 Ellen Balaam, the first woman surgeon in Melbourne

References

External links
 Photo of class in 1914 - State of Victoria Library

Public high schools in Melbourne
Educational institutions established in 1905
Defunct schools in Victoria (Australia)
1905 establishments in Australia
Buildings and structures in Melbourne City Centre